Sanjeeta Bhattacharya is a Grammy nominated Indian singer, songwriter and actor.

A graduate of Berklee College of Music, she has been a part of festivals such as Panama Jazz Festival, Hornbill Festival, NH7 Weekender and Magnetic Fields Festival.  As part of her personal project, she has released a series of singles and her track, “Everything’s Fine?” put her on Spotify's global emerging artist program, RADAR in July 2020. Her first international collaboration was with Malagasy singer Niu Raza called ‘Red’.
Sanjeeta debuted as an actor in the Netflix series “Feels Like Ishq” on July 23, 2021.

Bhattacharya is also known for her performance that paid tribute to A. R. Rahman at Berklee College of Music in 2014 featuring 109 performers from 32 countries. A. R. Rahman was awarded an honorary doctorate from Berklee College of Music at that event.

Personal life and education
Bhattacharya was born in New Delhi, India. She is the daughter of artist Sanjay Bhattacharya. She graduated from Berklee College of Music, known for the study of jazz and modern American music.
Sanjeeta is often referred to as an up-and-coming jazz musician, but she prefers to avoid categorizing her music. She stated during the interview with The Times of India that:

Musical style
Her music weaves influences from R&B, Indie folk and Latin styles with multi-lingual lyrics to create stories around myriad personal experiences.

Discography

Web series

Commercials and advertisements

Sanjeeta appeared in televisions advertisement of Clean & Clear, Samsung India, Instagram and Dream11.

Other works
Sanjeeta was a TEDx speaker at TEDx, Pune.

References

External links

Living people
Indian women singers
21st-century Indian singers
Berklee College of Music alumni
Date of birth missing (living people)
Year of birth missing (living people)